Defenseless is a 1991 legal thriller film directed by Martin Campbell and produced by Renée Missel and David Bombek.

Plot
Lawyer Thelma 'T.K.' Knudsen Katwuller represents Steven Seldes - who is accused of involvement in making underage porn movies, though he claims innocence - and he is also her lover. When T.K. meets Steven's wife Ellie things turn awkward, as the two women had been college roommates. When T.K. subsequently confronts Steven at his office, a fight ensues in which she injures him with a letter opener. When T.K. returns later on, she finds Steven dead with multiple stab wounds. Upon finding Ellie's sweater at the crime scene, the police arrest her for the murder and T.K. agrees to defend her.

Cast
 Barbara Hershey as Thelma "T.K." Katwuller
 Sam Shepard as Detective Beutel
 J.T. Walsh as Steven Seldes
 Mary Beth Hurt as Ellie Seldes
 Sheree North as Mrs. Bodeck
 George P. Wilbur as Sherman Bodeck

Home media

Defenseless was released on VHS by Live Home Video and around the same time in Canada by Cineplex Odeon. A TV edit of the film was released on DVD in 2002 by Platinum Disc. A widescreen unedited DVD was released in Japan  by Universal Studios Home Entertainment, under license from StudioCanal, in 2007.

External links
 
 
 

1991 films
Films directed by Martin Campbell
1991 thriller films
Films about lawyers
Films about murder
American courtroom films
1990s English-language films
1990s American films